Joseph Sylvio Theobald Mantha (April 14, 1902 – August 7, 1974) was a Canadian professional ice hockey defenceman who played fourteen seasons in the National Hockey League for the Montreal Canadiens and Boston Bruins.  Elected to the Hockey Hall of Fame in 1960, he was regarded as one of the best two-way defencemen of his day.

Amateur career
Mantha started as a right winger for the Notre Dame de Grace Juniors in 1919, before playing for Verdun in the Intermediate Mount Royal Hockey League, and Imperial Tobacco and Northern Electric in the Montreal industrial league. He played briefly for the Montreal Nationales in the Quebec league. After scoring four goals in nine games with the Nationales, he was signed by the Montreal Canadiens in December of 1923.

NHL career

The Canadiens started Mantha as a forward, then moved him to defence as part of a youth movement, because veteran Montreal defencemen Sprague Cleghorn and Billy Coutu were aging. He was used sparingly as a substitute that first season, but gained more ice time thereafter as an injury replacement for Coutu and as Cleghorn was suspended during the season. Mantha played more regularly in the playoffs, helping the Canadiens to the 1924 Stanley Cup championship.

When Cleghorn was traded just before the 1925–26 NHL season, Mantha gained a more prominent role. With the further trade of Coutu to Boston in the 1927 offseason, he was named captain of the team, and paired with Herb Gardiner -- acquired with the breakup of the Western Hockey League from the Calgary Tigers -- to become the new starting defencemen for the Canadiens. Mantha was injured in the playoffs that year, but recovered to score Montreal's only goal on an end-to-end rush in the deciding (and losing) game to the Ottawa Senators.

Newly paired with defenceman Battleship Leduc after Gardiner left to become player-coach in Chicago, Mantha scored the first-ever goal in Boston Garden on November 20, 1928, leading the Canadiens to a 1–0 win over the Boston Bruins. Mantha also got to play with his brother Georges that season, a rookie forward signed by Montreal.  By the end of the season, Mantha was paired on defence with Marty Burke, a partnership that would last for several seasons.

The 1929–30 saw Montreal win its second Stanley Cup during Mantha's tenure, in which he starred with two goals in the best-of-three Stanley Cup Finals series against the heavily favored Bruins, which had the best winning percentage in NHL history during the regular season. In this season, Mantha had career highs in goals, assists and points, finishing second among league defencemen to King Clancy of the Senators in goals, and third behind Clancy and Bruin Eddie Shore in points.

The first season-ending All-Star Team was named in 1930–31, and Mantha was named Second Team All-Star on defence for both that year and the next, for his prowess as a defensive defenceman. Goaltender George Hainsworth would take over as team captain for Mantha in 1933, a post Mantha would regain the following season.

Following an incident in the 1934 season where Mantha successfully substituted for the suspended Newsy Lalonde as coach for the Habs in two matches -- and beginning to fade as a player, no longer being a starter by the 1934 playoffs -- he was named the full-time player-coach for the 1935–36 NHL season. After a dismal season, with Montreal missing the playoffs for the first time in a decade and finishing in last place, the Canadiens fired him as a coach, and then released him as a player before the start of the 1937 season. 

In a game against the New York Rangers on January 28, 1937, Boston superstar Eddie Shore sustained a back injury that proved to be season ending.  In consequence, the Bruins signed Mantha as a replacement.  It took some time for him to get into game shape, and ultimately he played only four games for Boston. Spurred on by cracking a bone in his elbow, Mantha admitted he could no longer play at a competitive level, and retired.

Retirement 
After retirement as a player, Mantha worked as a linesman and referee for both the American Hockey League and the NHL.  However, he found the continual travel required of an on-ice official grueling, and transitioned to coaching for Montreal-area junior league teams. He coached the Montreal Concordias, Laval Nationales (1943–1945), Verdun Maple Leafs (1945–1947), St. Jerome Eagles (1947–1948, 1951–1952), and Verdun Lasalle (1950–1951) before leaving organized hockey for good. During this time, Mantha was instrumental in steering future Hall of Famer Bernie Geoffrion to the Concordias, which at the time were under the control of the Canadiens, after seeing the then-14 year old Geoffrion score five goals in a match.

Mantha was inducted into the Hockey Hall of Fame in 1960, and died in Montreal in August 1974.

The Georges and Sylvio Mantha Arenas are part of the Complexe Récréatif Gadbois in Montreal and named for him and his brother Georges Mantha.

Career statistics

* Stanley Cup Champion.

NHL coaching record

See also
List of members of the Hockey Hall of Fame

References

External links
 

1902 births
1974 deaths
Boston Bruins players
Canadian ice hockey coaches
Canadian ice hockey defencemen
Hockey Hall of Fame inductees
Ice hockey people from Montreal
Montreal Canadiens coaches
Montreal Canadiens players
National Hockey League officials
Stanley Cup champions
Ice hockey player-coaches